Base Aérea do Recife – BARF  is a base of the Brazilian Air Force, located in Recife, Brazil.

It shares some facilities with Recife/Guararapes–Gilberto Freyre International Airport.

History
Recife Air Force Base was created on 24 July 1941 by Decree 3,459.

Units
Since January 2017 there are no permanent flying units assigned to Recife Air Force Base. Whenever needed, the aerodrome is used as a support facility to other air units of the Brazilian Air Force, Navy and Army.

Former Units
May 1969–January 2018: 2nd Squadron of Air Transportation (2°ETA) Pastor. The squadron was moved to Natal Air Force Base.

Access
The base is located 14 km from downtown Recife.

Accidents and incidents
28 July 1968: a United States Air Force Douglas C-124C Globemaster II registration 51–5178, flying from Paramaribo-Zanderij to Recife, while on approach to land at Recife, flew into a 1890 feet high hill 80 km away from Recife. The 10 occupants died.
21 December 1969: a Brazilian Air Force Lockheed C-130E Hercules registration FAB-2450 crashed shortly after takeoff. All 7 occupants died.
23 October 1992: a Brazilian Air Force Embraer C-95 Bandeirante registration FAB-2243 crashed in the vicinity of the Base while operating on a low level display flight. All 5 occupants died.

Gallery
This gallery displays aircraft that have been based at Fortaleza. The gallery is not comprehensive.

See also
List of Brazilian military bases
Recife/Guararapes–Gilberto Freyre International Airport

References

External links

Pernambuco
Brazilian Air Force
Brazilian Air Force bases
Buildings and structures in Pernambuco
Recife